Nacka SK was a Swedish sports club based in the Stockholm suburb of Nacka.  The club was notable in bandy but particularly in ice hockey, having played 23 seasons in the top tier of ice hockey in Sweden, though never managing to win the Swedish championship.  The last ice hockey season the club played in the top tier was the 1971–72 Division 1 season.  Following seasons in the second tier, and their failure to achieve promotion to Elitserien (now the SHL) in the 1976 qualifiers, the club merged with Atlas Copco IF and Skuru IK to form NSA-76, which was then renamed Nacka HK in 1980.

External links
 Club history on Elitepropspects.com

Sport in Stockholm
Ice hockey teams in Sweden
Ice hockey clubs established in 1906
Bandy clubs established in 1906
Defunct bandy clubs in Sweden
1906 establishments in Sweden